The 2016 United States House of Representatives election in North Dakota was held on November 8, 2016, to elect the U.S. representative from North Dakota's at-large congressional district. The election coincided with the 2016 U.S. presidential election, the North Dakota Governor election, U.S. Senate election, as well as other statewide, legislative, and local elections. This was first House election since the state legislature changed voter ID requirements, revoking the ability to vote using a student ID.

Incumbent Republican U.S. Representative Kevin Cramer ran for a 3rd term. The primaries were held on June 14.

Republican primary

Candidate
 Kevin Cramer, incumbent U.S. Representative

Results

Democratic-NPL Primary

Candidate
 Chase Iron Eyes, attorney and American Indian activist

Results

Libertarian primary

Candidate
 Robert  "Jack" Seaman, businessman, 2014 Libertarian nominee for U.S. Representative from North Dakota

Results

General election

See also 
 United States House of Representatives elections, 2016

Notes

North Dakota 
2016
United States House of Representative